Seed of Hope is a Television Broadcasts Limited drama released on 23 September 2003 in Hong Kong. It was screened on TVB Jade.

Cast
Patrick Tam
Kenix Kwok
Anne Heung
Wayne Lai
Kingdom Yuen
Ellesmere Choi
Cheung Tsi Kwong
Gordon Liu
Ching Ho Wai

External links
Official Website
Seed of Hope Cast and Theme Song

Hong Kong television soap operas
TVB dramas
2003 Hong Kong television series debuts
2003 Hong Kong television series endings